Mullaghmore is a mountain in County Londonderry, Northern Ireland. It is part of the Sperrins and the 359th highest point on the island of Ireland The summit is dominated by a large telecommunication tower. The peak is located 5 miles north of the village of Draperstown, and 6 miles south of Dungiven. It is also locally known as, "The Birren" hence the road name passing over it is "Birren Road"

References

Mountains and hills of County Londonderry
Marilyns of Northern Ireland